Mitino is a rural locality (a village) in Moshokskoye Rural Settlement, Sudogodsky District, Vladimir Oblast, Russia. The population was 15 as of 2010.

Geography 
Mitino is located 55 km east of Sudogda (the district's administrative centre) by road. Radilovo is the nearest rural locality.

References 

Rural localities in Sudogodsky District